Susan Bluestein (born May 27, 1946) is an American casting director and the widow of actor Brad Davis.

Biography
Born in Manhattan and raised in Queens, New York, Bluestein has spent much of her career casting television movies, including The People vs. Jean Harris, A Piano for Mrs. Cimino, Casualties of Love: The Long Island Lolita Story, and Oldest Living Confederate Widow Tells All. She cast multiple episodes of the series Punky Brewster, Providence and JAG and has cast every episode of NCIS and NCIS: Los Angeles since their premieres.

Bluestein's casting credits for feature films include Crimes of the Heart, Who's Harry Crumb?, and Homeward Bound: The Incredible Journey. Other projects are the 2008 BBC/HBO docudrama House of Saddam and Dilli 6.

Awards
Bluestein won the Emmy Award in 1995 for Outstanding Individual Achievement in Casting for her work on NYPD Blue.

In 2014, NCIS star Pauley Perrette presented Bluestein and her casting partner, Jason Kennedy, the Media Access Casting Society of America Award for their work promoting awareness of the disability experience, accessibility for people with disabilities, and the accurate depiction of characters with disabilities.

Family
Bluestein and Davis were married in 1976 and had one child, actor Alex Blue Davis, who is a transgender man. In 1985, Davis was diagnosed HIV-positive, a condition he and his wife kept secret until just before his death in 1991, by assisted suicide. His wife Susan co-authored a biographical memoir in 1997.

Casting filmography

References

External links
 

1946 births
Living people
American health activists
American casting directors
Women casting directors
HIV/AIDS activists
People from Queens, New York
Activists from New York (state)